So Familiar is a studio album by bluegrass duo Steve Martin and Edie Brickell. It was released on October 30, 2015 by Rounder Records.

Track listing

Charts

References

2015 albums
Steve Martin albums
Edie Brickell albums
Albums produced by Peter Asher
Collaborative albums
Rounder Records albums
Country albums by American artists
Bluegrass albums